Valerian Trifa (secular name Viorel Donise Trifa ; June 28, 1914 – January 28, 1987) was a Romanian Orthodox cleric and fascist political activist, who served as archbishop of the Romanian Orthodox Church in America and Canada. For part of his life, he was a naturalized citizen of the United States, until he was stripped of his American citizenship for lying about his involvement in the murder of hundreds of Jews during the Holocaust and World War II.

A prominent affiliate of the Iron Guard, a Romanian fascist organization also known as the Legionnaire Movement, Trifa played a part in provoking the Legionnaires' Rebellion of 1941. His antisemitic discourse was suspected of helping instigate the parallel pogrom against the Jewish community in Bucharest. After being singled out as a rebel by Ion Antonescu, Romania's Conducător and a competitor of the Iron Guard, he spent the final years of World War II in Nazi Germany, as a detainee with privileged status. Trifa subsequently made his way into the United States, where he came to lead the Romanian-American Orthodox community into opposition with the main Orthodox Church in Communist Romania.

Beginning in 1975, his wartime activities came to the attention of the United States Department of Justice, and the subsequent inquiry made Trifa relinquish his American citizenship and move to Portugal. The scandal's ramifications came to involve several institutions, including the National Council of Churches, Radio Free Europe, West German law enforcement, and the Israeli and Portuguese governments, while allegations surfaced that Romania's secret police, the Securitate, was using the controversy to advance its own goals.

Biography

Early life and activism
Born in Câmpeni, Transylvania (in Austria-Hungary at the time), he was the son of schoolteacher Dionisie Trifa, and the nephew of Iosif Trifa, an Orthodox priest who founded Oastea Domnului ("The Lord's Army"). He studied at the school of his native village, then at the Horia Gymnasium of Câmpeni and the Gheorghe Lazăr High School of Sibiu, from which he graduated in 1931. Between 1931 and 1935, he studied theology at the University of Chişinău, graduating magna cum laude. He then studied philosophy at the University of Bucharest and, in 1939, history and journalism at the University of Berlin. Trifa's first employment was with Oastea Domnului, being charged with managing its publishing house: he issued the movement's eponymous magazine, its other journal Lumina Satelor, and the books of his uncle Iosif.

While a student, Trifa joined the Iron Guard, and was a contributor to its Orăştie-based Libertatea newspaper; in 1940, during the National Legionary State (the period when the Iron Guard was in power), he was elected president of the National Union of Romanian Christian Students, a Legionnaire organization.

Legionnaires' Rebellion and the Bucharest pogrom
Although hostile to the Guard's new leader, Horia Sima, he became involved in the January 1941 confrontation between Sima's Legionnaires and Ion Antonescu. In early 1941, the conflict for power turned into an Iron Guard-led failed rebellion and a pogrom against the Jewish population in Bucharest where over one hundred Jews and Romanians were massacred.

Known as the Legionnaires' Rebellion, the event was partly motivated by the killing of a German Reich resident and local Abwehr chief, Major Döring — which was probably accomplished with assistance from the British Intelligence Service. In this context, Trifa issued several statements which played a part in instigating the riots. They were noted for their antisemitic remarks, and included arguments such as "A group of Jews and Jew-lovers are ruling everything". In one of his manifestos, Trifa blamed the Jews in general for Döring's assassination, while nominating two politicians associated with Antonescu (Eugen Cristescu and the former Undersecretary of the Interior Alexandru Rioşanu), whom, he alleged, were protectors of the Jews. His text, which relied on the assumption that Döring had been killed by Greek agents and formed part of a Legionnaire press campaign, read:

... the protectors and defenders of this Greek-origin assassin are: Eugen Cristescu, chief of the [Romanian] secret service and a former confidant of Armand Călinescu [the former Prime Minister and Iron Guard adversary, assassinated by the Legionnaries in 1939] and Alexandru Rioșanu, the man of the Jews and of the Greeks .... We demand the replacement of all Jew-turned [jidovite] persons inside the government.

Internment and early self-exile
Following Antonescu's repression of the rebels, Viorel Trifa fled to the Reich, where he was interned in the camps of Sachsenhausen, Buchenwald and Dachau. Romanian authorities tried him in absentia, alongside other Iron Guard leaders, and sentenced him to life imprisonment and labor. In early 1943, while in Buchenwald, Trifa was among the prominent Legionnaires who agreed to disavow Sima's policies (the group also included Vasile Iasinschi, Ilie Gârneaţă, Constantin Popovici, Dumitru Grozea, and Corneliu Georgescu). According to historian Radu Ioanid, this move was mediated by German officials, who hoped to obtain a reconciliation between Antonescu and the Iron Guard. Ioanid, who described the Legionnaires' internment as a "bearable regime" in comparison to that of other prisoners in the same camps, noted that they were visited by high-ranking Nazi officials who warned them not to engage in any political activity. In a June 2007 article, the Italian weekly L'Espresso defined Trifa as "a guest in Germany, protected by the Nazis".

After Trifa was freed, he was briefly secretary to Metropolitan bishop Visarion Puiu in Vienna and then Paris, and, following the end of World War II, he was a professor of ancient history in Italy, at a Roman Catholic college. He moved to the United States on July 17, 1950, using the Displaced Persons Immigration Law. According to L'Espresso, this was made possible by the intervention of a "high-ranking [Italian Catholic] prelate".

He was subsequently a writer at the Solia Romanian language newspaper in Cleveland, Ohio. At the Congress of the dissident Romanian Orthodox Church in America held in Chicago on July 2, 1951, Trifa was chosen bishop and then moved to Grass Lake, Michigan, where the headquarters of the Romanian Orthodox Episcopate is located. This came after he led his congregation in occupying the residence, thus chasing away representatives of the Orthodox Church in Romania — as the latter was by then subordinated to the Romanian Communist Party.

In 1955, he gave the opening prayer before the United States Senate and he became a member of the governing board of the National Council of Churches. Fifteen years later, he became an archbishop, as his church wanted to affirm its autonomy.

Department of Justice investigation
As early as 1957, Charles Kremer, a Romanian-born dentist and Jewish community activist, was involved in collecting evidence to have Trifa tried for war crimes in the American justice system. In time, Kremer succeeded in bringing attention to his cause: according to Time, Trifa's file was reopened "largely through his efforts".

The United States Department of Justice started its case against Trifa in 1975, the core of its argument being that he entered the United States under false pretenses, hiding his Iron Guard membership. American authorities also reported that Trifa had mentioned his internment in Nazi camps, but had not made it clear that he had benefited from preferential treatment. In October 1976, a group of members of the Concerned Jewish Youth organization took over the headquarters of the National Council of Churches building, as a protest against the refusal of the organization to oust Trifa. The archbishop was ousted from the body in November, after the Council stated that, in what concerns Nazi atrocities, "we cannot allow any doubt about a complete repudiation".

When focus shifted to his role in the 1941 Rebellion, Trifa denied his involvement, despite being confronted with evidence (sent by the Romanian government), including a photo of him in an Iron Guard uniform and texts of his pro-Nazi speeches and articles. He claimed he was not ashamed of his past, as he had no alternatives and he did what he thought was best for the Romanian people, and attributed authorship of his 1941 inflammatory speeches to other persons. He nevertheless admitted having lied to American authorities upon entering the United States. Further evidence against Trifa was a postcard addressed to Nazi leader Heinrich Himmler and signed by "Viorel Trifa". Trifa denied ever writing it, but, using imaging techniques, American forensic scientists managed to recover a latent fingerprint identified as belonging to him.

The Office of Special Investigations (OSI) of the U.S. Justice Department was established in 1979 for the purpose of expelling Nazi war criminals that had entered the U.S. OSI prosecuted Trifa with the intention of stripping him of his U.S citizenship and deporting him. The trial began in October 1982. Trifa wanted to avoid being returned to Romania, where he had been convicted in absentia in 1941 and sentenced to life imprisonment. He agreed to settle the case, acknowledging that he had been a member of the Iron Guard and had concealed this information when he entered the U.S. He agreed to leave the U.S. within 60 days.

The Israeli prosecutor Gideon Hausner pressured for the extradition of Valerian Trifa so that Israel could try Trifa for crimes against humanity, and famed Nazi hunter Zev Golan was instrumental in coordinating between the Simon Wiesenthal Center and Israeli Police in seeking a trial, but the Israeli government never made any official extradition claim, nor issued any warrants. An offer for extradition was made in April 1983 by the OSI, but was rejected by the Israeli government. When news of this refusal leaked to the Israeli press, a polemic was sparked between Hausner and Menachem Begin's executive, but the latter chose not to reconsider its earlier decision. According to The New York Times, the stance may have implied that "the Israelis did not feel they could build a sufficient war crimes case against [Trifa]." In parallel, Charles Kremer stated his dissatisfaction with Israel's decision.

At the time, Trifa's early convictions caused another scandal. In May 1979, upon instructions from Noël Bernard, Radio Free Europe's Romanian contributor Liviu Floda interviewed Trifa on his Church's activities. Bernard's initiative was allegedly questioned by Floda and his employers alike. News of the interview's broadcast caused virulent reactions inside the United States, and resulted in a hearing by a subcommittee of the United States House Committee on International Relations.

Renunciation of citizenship and Portuguese refuge
In 1980, Trifa gave up his American citizenship. In 1982, he left the United States to avoid deportation due to the ongoing investigation. He had earlier agreed to deportation before an immigration judge in Detroit, explaining that the trial was placing a financial strain on his congregation.

Nevertheless, his adversaries considered Trifa's action an admission of guilt, in respect to both the technical charge and the accusations of war crimes. According to Time, although Trifa's defense team rejected the claims, it did not deny Trifa's fascist and antisemitic convictions and speeches, including the 1941 statements, but stated that its client had no intention of causing a pogrom. They also argued that Valerian Trifa had acted after being forced to choose between the pro-Soviet and the pro-Nazi camps, contending that antisemitism was "rampant at the time."

After spending two years searching for a country to give him refuge, he settled in Estoril, Portugal. In an interview he gave shortly before leaving, Trifa claimed that he had "happened to get put in a moment of history when some people wanted to make a point. The point was to revive the Holocaust. But all this talk by the Jews about the Holocaust is going to backfire."

In autumn 1984, the Portuguese authorities declared Trifa an undesirable, and indicated that he had failed to reveal his fascist sympathies when requesting and obtaining a temporary visa. According to Reuters, Portuguese officials indicated that "it was against Portugal's interests for Archbishop Trifa to live here and he must leave as soon as possible." Initially, they allowed the prelate three months to leave the country's territory. Trifa contested the decision with the Supreme Administrative Court, which put off his actual deportation for several years.

The deportation was still in progress when Valerian Trifa died at the age of 72, in a Cascais hospital, during emergency treatment for a heart attack.

Legacy
Beginning in the late 1980s, Ion Mihai Pacepa, a former general in the communist secret police (the Securitate) who defected to the United States, claimed that Trifa had been the victim of a frameup engineered by his former colleagues. Pacepa linked this to an alleged trip by Romanian bishop Bartolomeu Anania to the United States, of which he claimed was a common attempt of the regime and the main Orthodox Church to quell the dissidence of Romanian-American Orthodox believers.

In a 2003 article for Revista 22, Noël Bernard's wife, Ioana Măgură Bernard, noted that her husband was being targeted by the Securitate, and argued that, especially after the Trifa interview, the communist institution attempted to stir up animosity inside Radio Free Europe in order to have Bernard stripped of his position. Based on evidence from her husband's Securitate file, she also described Bernard's mysterious 1981 death as an assassination, arguing that it formed the culmination of various failed attempts to silence him.

In 2007, journalists at L'Espresso cited Trifa among the suspected war criminals who, it claimed, may have been actively aided by the Roman Catholic Church in avoiding investigation. The magazine suggested that the frequency of such cases could help explain why Italy had been resisting the ratification needed for opening the International Tracing Service archives managed by the International Committee of the Red Cross and kept in Bad Arolsen.

The papers of Dr. Charles Kremer, dating from 1930 to 1984 and documenting his lifelong work to bring Trifa to justice, are housed in the Special Collections of Lloyd Sealy Library, John Jay College of Criminal Justice, in New York City.

References

Further reading
Feigin, Judy and Mark M. Richard, The Office of Special Investigations: Striving for Accountability in the Aftermath of the Holocaust, US Department of Justice, December 2006
Gerald J. Bobango, Religion and Politics: Bishop Valerian Trifa and His Times, East European Monographs, Boulder & New York, distributed by Columbia University Press, 1981.
Traian Lascu, Valerian, 1951–1984, Knello, Detroit, 1984.
Ion Mihai Pacepa, Red Horizons: Chronicles of a Communist Spy Chief, Regnery Gateway, Washington, D.C., 1987.
Dr. Charles H. Kremer Papers, housed at the Lloyd Sealy Library Special Collections, John Jay College of Criminal Justice (view upon request)

1914 births
1987 deaths
American anti-communists
University of Bucharest alumni
Eastern Orthodox clergy convicted of crimes
People from Câmpeni
People from the Kingdom of Hungary
Romanian Austro-Hungarians
Bishops of the Orthodox Church in America
Members of the Iron Guard
Romanian magazine editors
Holocaust perpetrators in Romania
Romanian collaborators with Nazi Germany
Romanian publishers (people)
Romanian anti-communists
Romanian emigrants to the United States
Fugitives wanted by Romania
Eastern Orthodoxy and far-right politics
Romanian expatriates in Portugal
Eastern Orthodox bishops in the United States
People from Grass Lake, Michigan
Loss of United States citizenship by prior Nazi affiliation
20th-century American clergy